Mothusi Gopane (born 28 January 1992) is a South African footballer who plays as a midfielder or winger for Boeung Ket.

Career

Gopane started his career with South African second division side Polokwane City, where he made 40 league appearances and scored 4 goals.

Before the second half of 2014/15, Gopane signed for SuperSport United in the South African top flight, where he made 4 league appearances and scored 0 goals.

In 2017, Gopane signed for South African second division club Mbombela United, but suffered a year-long injury. He was dropped by the club because of this. After that, he rejected an offer Cape Town Spurs in the South African top flight due to injury, before joining South African third division team Baberwa FC.

Before the 2020 season, he signed for Boeung Ket in Cambodia.

Recently, he was recognized for playing the most minutes in a season last campaign.

References

External links
 
 Mothusi Gopane at playmakerstats.com

South African soccer players
Living people
Expatriate footballers in Cambodia
National First Division players
1992 births
Boeung Ket Rubber Field players
South African expatriate soccer players
Free State Stars F.C. players
South African Premier Division players
Mbombela United F.C. players
Polokwane City F.C. players
Association football wingers
Association football midfielders
SuperSport United F.C. players
People from North West (South African province)